Eclectic is a live album by the Scottish rock band Big Country, released in 1996 by Castle Communications. It was produced by Big Country and Gary Langan, and reached No. 41 in the UK. In 2001, a video version of Eclectic was released under the same name by Castle.

Eclectic was recorded at Dingwalls in London on 20–21 March 1996 and features guest appearances by Bobby Valentino, Kym Mazelle, Carol Laula, Steve Harley, Aaron Emerson, Hossam Ramzy (and his percussion section) and Mohammed Toufiq.

Critical reception

On its release, Aaron Badgley of AllMusic described Eclectic as a "terrific album", "interesting due to the choice of songs" and full of "great songs, played very well". He concluded, "While fans of Big Country will love this collection, it has a wide appeal to music fans in general."

Track listing

Personnel
Big Country
 Stuart Adamson - lead vocals, acoustic guitar
 Bruce Watson - acoustic guitar, mandolin
 Tony Butler - acoustic bass, backing vocals
 Mark Brzezicki - drums, backing vocals

Guest musicians
 Hossam Ramzy (The Hossam Ramzy Percussion Section), Mohammed Toufiq - percussion (tracks 1, 3, 7, 9, 11-12)
 Bobby Valentino - violin (all tracks)
 Kym Mazelle - guest vocalist (tracks 2, 5)
 Carol Laula - guest vocalist (track 3)
 Steve Harley - guest vocalist (track 9)
 Aaron Emerson - keyboards (tracks 2, 4-6, 8, 12-13)

Production
 Big Country - producers
 Gary Langan - producer, recorded by
 Alan Morrison - live sound

Other
 Zarkowski Designs - design
 Justin Thomas - booklet photography
 Hugh Gilmour - front and back cover design and photography
 Ian Grant Management - management

References

1996 live albums
Big Country albums
Castle Communications live albums